Stanley Kasongo Kakubo (born 24 May 1980) is a Zambian politician. He has served as Member of the National Assembly for Kapiri Mposhi since 2016 and as Minister of Foreign Affairs since 2021.

Biography
Kakubo was born in Livingstone and spent part of his youth living in Kapiri Mposhi. His father worked for Zambia Railways. He attended the School of Natural Sciences at the University of Zambia, before leaving to study chartered accountancy in United Kingdom. After returning to Zambia, he joined the Zambia National Commercial Bank where he was a manager for treasury and business banking.

Kakubo was chosen as United Party for National Development candidate for Kapiri Mposhi for the 2016 general elections, a seat held by the Patriotic Front. He was subsequently elected to the National Assembly with a 1,590 majority. After becoming an MP, he joined the parliamentary Budget Committee.

In February 2021 Kakubo was appointed to the UPND national management committee. In the 2021 general elections he was re-elected with a 4,000-vote majority. With UPND leader Hakainde Hichilema winning the presidential election, Kakubo was appointed Minister of Foreign Affairs on 7 September.

References

1980 births
Living people
Foreign Ministers of Zambia
Members of the National Assembly of Zambia
People from Livingstone, Zambia
United Party for National Development politicians
University of Zambia alumni
Zambian accountants